Arman İnci (born February 4, 1991) is a Turkish-German actor.

Filmography

Television

References

External links

1991 births
German people of Turkish descent
German male film actors
German male child actors
Living people
German male television actors